Weaverham High School is a large non-denominational co-educational comprehensive secondary school in Weaverham, Cheshire, England. It is a mixed-sex school containing 11- to 16-year-olds.

Weaverham High School is one of the partner high schools of Sir John Deane's College. Many pupils from the school that go on to attend sixth form will apply to Sir John Deane's, and similarly, a large proportion of the sixth form college's intake is from Weaverham High School.

In 1997, Weaverham High School was designated an official DfES Technology College, and in 1998 a new computer network was installed, with 380 new workstations and 18 interactive whiteboards. The school now has an interactive whiteboard and a computer in all major classrooms.

Over the last 10 years the school has undergone a large scale refurbishment, starting with a new sports hall and all-weather astroturf pitch, a purpose-built science block, a creative arts centre including a fully equipped drama studio, a library and learning resource centre and new toilet facilities.

A fire in the mathematics department in 2007 triggered further major refurbishments to both the affected department, and the adjacent Design and Technology Department. Previously separate buildings, the two are now joined completely by an extension built across the path that was previously used as an entrance to both departments.

Weaverham High School pupils are noted for academic achievement, with both a higher than average intake from primary school, and GCSE results consistently above the country's average. In 2008 the percentage of pupils achieving five or more GCSEs at grades A*-C was 66%, with the average being 65.3%. The figure for 2009 was 75%.

The school has recently had further construction to adding 2 more science laboratories and new language and geography rooms.

Notable alumni 

 Thomas Keeler - Award winning marathon runner and amateur footballer now living in Auckland, New Zealand. 40 appearances for Ponsonby Villa FC with 1 goal.

External links
 Weaverham High School homepage
 Latest OFSTED Report
 Student Performance Analysis
School Results 2009
Promotional Video

Educational institutions established in 1956
Secondary schools in Cheshire West and Chester
1956 establishments in England
Foundation schools in Cheshire West and Chester